The Nice Observatory is an astronomical observatory located in Nice, France on the summit of Mount Gros. The observatory was founded in 1879, by the banker Raphaël Bischoffsheim. The architect was Charles Garnier, and Gustave Eiffel designed the main dome.

In 1886 the largest refracting (i.e., with an objective lens rather than a mirror) telescope in the World made its debut at Nice Observatory, the Grand Lunette.

Description 

The  refractor telescope made by Henry and Gautier became operational around 1886–1887,
was the largest in a privately funded observatory, and the first at such high altitude ( above sea level).
In the records for the largest refracting telescopes all three were outperformed by the  refractor installed at the Lick Observatory at 1,283 m altitude in 1889.

As a scientific institution, the Nice Observatory no longer exists. It was merged with CERGA in 1988 to form the Côte d'Azur Observatory, which often is still referred to as "Nice Observatory".

The Nice Observatory was featured in the unsuccessful 1999 film Simon Sez. It was also the setting for the title scene in the 2014 Woody Allen flick Magic in the Moonlight.

Directors 

 Henri Perrotin (1880–1904)
 General J. A. L. Bassot (1904–1917)
 Gaston Fayet (1917–1962)
 Jean-Claude Pecker (1962–1969)
 Philippe Delache (1969–1972)
 Jean-Paul Zahn (1972–1975)
 Philippe Delache (1975)
 Jean-Paul Zahn (1975–1981)
 Raymond Michard (1981-1989)
 Philippe Delache (1989–1994)
 José Pacheco (1994–1999)
 Jacques Colin (1999–2009)
 Farrokh Vakili (2009–2015)
 Thierry Lanz (since 2015)

Gallery

See also 
 List of largest optical refracting telescopes
 List of largest optical reflecting telescopes
 List of astronomical observatories

References

External links 
 Monographie de l'observatoire de Nice by Charles Garnier

Astronomical observatories in France
Observatory
Second Empire architecture
Great refractors
Charles Garnier buildings